HIP 57274 is a star in the northern circumpolar constellation of Ursa Major with a system of three planets. It is invisible to the naked eye, having an apparent visual magnitude of 8.96. The distance to this system is 84.4 light years based on stellar parallax, and it is drifting further away with a radial velocity of +30 km/s.

This is an ordinary K-type main-sequence star with a stellar classification of K5V. It appears to be older than the Sun with an age of roughly eight billion years and is spinning slowly with a projected rotational velocity of under 1 km/s. The star has 73% of the mass of the Sun and 68% of the Sun's radius. The abundance of elements heavier than helium is about the same or slightly higher than in the Sun. The star is radiating just 19% of the luminosity of the Sun from its photosphere at an effective temperature of 4,640 K.

Planetary system
The three exoplanets orbiting HIP 57274 were discovered by the radial velocity method in 2011, all of them having mass significantly greater than the Earth. A 2014 search for planetary transits was unsuccessful. The planetary orbits are possibly highly variable, being strongly affected by mean motion resonances. The most stable region for a hypothetical super-earth within the star's habitable zone would be an orbit inside 0.37– from the host star.

References

K-type main-sequence stars
Planetary systems with three confirmed planets
Ursa Major (constellation)
J11444095+3057339
Durchmusterung objects
0439
057274